Durren Durren is a suburb of the Central Coast region of New South Wales, Australia. It is part of the  local government area.

See also 
 List of reduplicated Australian place names

Suburbs of the Central Coast (New South Wales)